HUB Uitgevers (HUB Publishers) was a Dutch magazine publisher. HUB Uitgevers was founded in 1993 and has grown to be one of the leading IT publishers, with over 15 consumer titles, and a number of business-to-business magazines. More recently they ventured into the lifestyle segment publishing two women's and a men's magazine.

In November 2007, HUB Uitgevers took over four magazine titles from VNU Media: Computer Idee, PCM, Power Unlimited and the Dutch license for Gizmodo magazine. In 2010 HUB Uitgevers acquired a considerable stake in Focus Media, publisher of the Netherlands' oldest photography magazine.

On August 26 the publisher filed for bankruptcy, one day later the bankruptcy was granted.

Consumer magazine key titles
 Computer Idee
 Hardware.Info magazine
 HET - Home Entertainment Today
 [N]Gamer
 PC Plus
 PC-Active
 Personal Computer Magazine (PCM)
 Power Unlimited

Business magazine key titles
 Hardware.Info
 Linux Magazine
 NetOpus
 Vives

Photography magazine key titles
 Focus
 FotoMagazine.info

Women's lifestyle
 Jansen
 MATCH

Men's lifestyle
 LOUDER

Magazine publishing companies of the Netherlands
Computer magazine publishing companies
Publishing companies established in 1993
Mass media in Haarlem